The 2018 WPA World Nine-ball Championship was a 9-Ball pool world Championships. The event took place between December 10 to 20, 2018 in the al-Attiya Sports Arena of the Al-Arabi Sports Club in Doha, Qatar. The Qatari capital held the event for the eighth time in a row.

The reigning champion was Filipino Carlo Biado, who defeated his compatriot Roland Garcia 13–5 in the 2017 final. Biado would reach the final of the event, defeating Shane Van Boening in the semi-final. Germany's Joshua Filler won the event, defeating Biado in the final 13–10.

Tournament summary
The event was entered by 128 participants who were initially divided into 16 groups of 8 players, in which they competed against each other from December 14 to 16 in a double elimination tournament. Four players in each group qualified for the final round, which will be played from December 17 to 20. The event was played under "alternating break" format.

In the initial double-elimination round, 2003 and 2013 champion Thorsten Hohmann was eliminated, having first lost 6–9 to Jason Theron, and then to 2005 champion Wu Jiaqing also 6–9, despite being ahead 6–2.

Later in the event, 9-ball world number one Klenti Kaci was defeated in the round of 32 – 10–11 to 17 year old Robbie Capito. Capito was at one stage 7–1, and 10–8 down in the match, but won the final three racks to win the match.

The semi-finals and final were played on the December 20, 2018. The reigning champion Carlo Biado defeated Shane Van Boening in the first semi-final, whilst Joshua Filler defeated Alexander Kazakis in a final rack decider. Filler would win the event; climbing to an 11–7 lead, and eventually winning 13–10.

Prize money 
The event saw a total prize pool of $200,000.

Preliminary round

Group 1

Group 2

Group 3

Group 4

Group 5

Group 6

Group 7

Group 8

Group 9

Group 10

Group 11

Group 12

Group 13

Group 14

Group 15

Group 16

Finals

Grand Final

References

External links
 WPA World 9-ball championship 2018  at azbilliards.com

2018
WPA World Nine-ball Championship
WPA World Nine-ball Championship
International sports competitions hosted by Qatar
WPA World Nine-ball Championship
Sports competitions in Doha